The 2006 Tornado World Championships were held at the Club Náutico San Isidro in San Isidro, Argentina between 1 and 10 December 2006.

Results

External links
Official website
Results

2006 in sailing
Tornado World Championships
Sailing competitions in Argentina